Diplozoon is a genus of flatworms belonging to the family Diplozoidae.

The species of this genus are found in Europe.

Species:
 Diplozoon bileki Kritscher, 1991
 Diplozoon kashmirensis Kaw, 1950
 Diplozoon paradoxum von Nordmann, 1832

References

Polyopisthocotylea
Monogenea genera